Todd Clement Menegola (born 25 December 1967) is a former Australian rules footballer who played with Richmond in the Australian Football League (AFL).

Menegola started his career at Swan Districts in 1989 and was from Mukinbudin originally. He was a member of the Swan Districts WAFL premiership winning team in 1990.
 
Richmond acquired his services via the 1990 National Draft, at pick 16. He played in the AFL for three seasons, then returned to Swan Districts.

He was on Fremantle's list in 1995 but didn't play a senior AFL game with the club. Related to current AFL player, Sam Menegola.

References

External links
 
 

1967 births
Australian rules footballers from Western Australia
Richmond Football Club players
Swan Districts Football Club players
Living people
People from Mukinbudin, Western Australia